The 42nd Cuban National Series belonged to Industriales, who rode a 66-23 regular season into the playoffs, where they lost only two games before sweeping Villa Clara Naranjas in the final for their ninth title.

Regular season standings

Western zone

Eastern zone

Playoffs

References
 passim

Cuban National Series seasons
Base
Base
Cuba